Five Americans was a 1960s American rock band, most famous for their song "Western Union", which reached number five in the U.S. Billboard chart and was their only single to chart in the Top 20. In Canada, they had three in the Top 20.

Career
The Mutineers formed in Durant, Oklahoma (Southeastern State College) in 1962. The band members crossed paths at the university, and began performing a repertoire of Bo Diddley and Duane Eddy standards within the campus. In 1963, the band recorded their debut single, "Jackin' Around", in Dallas, Texas, an instrumental which received extensive airplay in their college. The British Invasion influenced The Mutineers to include Beatles numbers to their repertoire, a change in outfitting, and a slight emphasis to vocals. However, their most impactful acquisition was their utilization of the Vox Continental electronic organ, a later highlight of the group's sound. While in Dallas, the band achieved prominence playing as a frequent attraction in a venue called The Pirate's Nook. There they came to the attention of Abnak Records, whose president John Abdnor took the group under his wing. Shortly thereafter, the band identified themselves as the Five Americans.

For a short while after their five top singles "I See The Light", "Western Union", "Sound of Love", "Evol - Not Love", and "Zip Code" were released, they toured. However, their manager, Jon Abdnor Sr., president and owner of Abnak Records and Bankers Management and Services Insurance Co., was allowed control of their finances.

After Abdnor's death in 1996, all rights to their songs should have reverted to the original group, but Sundazed Records bought the original tapes. The Five Americans are now receiving their share of the sales and publishing royalties.

"Western Union"
In a March 1967 interview that appeared in Michael Oberman's "Top Tunes" column in the Evening Star newspaper (Washington, D.C.), Norman Ezell, guitarist for the group, explained how they came up with "Western Union." "Mike Rabon, our lead guitar player, was just fooling around with his guitar when he came up with a unique sound," Norman said. "It sort of reminded us of a telegraph key. That's when we decided to write 'Western Union.

Break-up
The Five Americans broke up in 1969 and went their separate ways after their single "7:30 Guided Tour" stalled at number 96 on the Billboard Hot 100.

Mike Rabon had a successful touring career afterwards, released two albums that sold well and played guitar for the Tyler, Texas, pop group Gladstone, whose "A Piece of Paper" reached number 45 in October 1972. He later returned to college, acquired a master's degree in public school administration, and worked in the Oklahoma school systems for 28 years.  Rabon married Cara Beth Whitworth in 1979.   He died on February 11, 2022, at the age of 78.

John Durrill, the keyboardist, who wrote "Dark Lady" for Cher and "Misery and Gin" for Merle Haggard and was also a member of the band The Ventures, now lives in Los Angeles.

Bassist Jim Grant died from a heart attack on November 29, 2004, at the age of 61.

Norman Ezell (guitar and harmonica) became a teacher and minister in Northern California. He died of cancer on May 8, 2010, at the age of 68.

Drummer Jimmy Wright (born James Thomas Wright on December 2, 1947) left the music industry to become a freelance photographer. He died at Texoma Medical Center on January 30, 2012, at the age of 64.

Discography

Albums
 I See the Light (BB No. 136) – HBR HLP-8503 (mono) / HST-9503 (stereo) (1966)
 Western Union (BB No. 121, CB No. 66) – Abnak ABLP-1967 (mono) / ABST-2067 (stereo) (1967)
 Progressions – Abnak ABLP (mono) / ABST-2069 (stereo) (1967)
 Now and Then – Abnak ABST-2071 (1968)

Singles

References

External links
 Five Americans at ClassicBands.com
 
 
 

1965 establishments in the United States
1969 disestablishments in the United States
Rock music groups from Texas
American garage rock groups
Musical groups established in 1965
Musical groups disestablished in 1969